Menzie David Chinn (born 1961) is a professor of public affairs and economics at the University of Wisconsin–Madison, co-editor of the Journal of International Money and Finance, and a Research Associate of the National Bureau of Economic Research International Finance and Macroeconomics Program.

Education and career
Chinn received a BA from Harvard College in 1984, a PhD in economics from the University of California at Berkeley in 1991, and was a senior economist with the White House Council of Economic Advisers from 2000 to 2001. He contributes to an economics blog at econbrowser.com which has been highly ranked by traffic amongst economics blogs, and is frequently interviewed by economics journalists.

Works
By citation, Chinn is ranked among the top 500 authors of economic journals and ranked 521 in terms of downloads on the Social Science Research Network. He has written extensively on international economics, trade and exchange rates.

He describes his teaching material as "the (old) neoclassical synthesis, i.e., Keynesian short run plus Classical long run — and some New Keynesian"

Lost Decades (with Jeffrey Frieden), W. W. Norton & Company, 2011

Most Cited Works
 Chinn, Menzie D., and Hiro Ito. "A new measure of financial openness." Journal of comparative policy analysis 10, no. 3 (2008): 309-322.
 Chinn, Menzie D., and Hiro Ito. "What matters for financial development? Capital controls, institutions, and interactions." Journal of development economics 81, no. 1 (2006): 163-192.
 Cheung, Yin-Wong, Menzie D. Chinn, and Antonio Garcia Pascual. "Empirical exchange rate models of the nineties: Are any fit to survive?." Journal of international money and finance 24, no. 7 (2005): 1150-1175.
 Chinn, Menzie D., and Eswar S. Prasad. "Medium-term determinants of current accounts in industrial and developing countries: an empirical exploration." Journal of International Economics 59, no. 1 (2003): 47-76.
 Chinn, Menzie D., and Robert W. Fairlie. "The determinants of the global digital divide: a cross-country analysis of computer and internet penetration." Oxford Economic Papers 59, no. 1 (2007): 16-44.

References

External links
econbrowser.com

1961 births
Living people
21st-century American economists
Harvard College alumni
UC Berkeley College of Letters and Science alumni
University of Wisconsin–Madison faculty